The National Academy of Public Administration is an academic institution that was founded by James E. Webb, then-administrator of NASA, and other leading public administration practitioners in 1967 and chartered under Title 36 of the United States Code in 1984 under . The academy is a nonprofit, nonpartisan organization focused on analyzing emerging trends in governance and public administration. It is one of the two organizations (the other being the National Academy of Sciences) chartered by Congress in this manner. Though the academy's funding comes primarily from studies that are congressionally requested or mandated, it is not considered a government agency. It is based in Washington, D.C. The group established the Louis Brownlow Book Award in 1968.

Background
The academy's studies are directed by a group of over 850 peer-elected fellows. Election to the National Academy is considered to be one of the highest honors by those engaged in the study or practice of public administration. The fellows are responsible for establishing the organization's policies and priorities and serving as advisers on panels, convened for each study, which issue the studies findings and recommendations.

Webb's impetus in forming the academy was to create an organization that would provide independent, nonpartisan and neutral advice to government leaders and agencies on all levels of government. The academy provides advice to a variety of organizations including:

 Various U.S. congressional committees
 U.S. Department of Energy
 U.S. Government Printing Office
 U.S. Office of Management and Budget
 U.S. Department of Defense
 U.S. Environmental Protection Agency
 U.S. Department of Homeland Security
 U.S. Agency for International Development
 Pension Benefit Guaranty Corporation
 National Weather Service
 Federal Bureau of Investigation
 Small Business Administration
 Federal Aviation Administration
 University of California

Mission 
As per the congressional charter, the academy's mission is:Through its trusted and experienced leaders, the Academy improves the quality, performance, and accountability of governments in the nation and the world. To this end, the Academy's Congressional Charter calls on it to:
 Evaluate the structure, administration, operation, and program performance of governments; anticipate, identify, and analyze significant problems; and suggest timely correct action;
 Foresee and examine critical issues in governance; and formulate practical approaches to their resolution;
 Assess the effectiveness, structure, administration, and implications for governance of present or proposed public programs, policies, and processes; and recommend specific changes;
 Advise on relationship of federal, state, regional, and local governments; increase public officials', citizens', and scholars' understanding of requirements and opportunities for sound governance and how these can be effectively met;
 Demonstrate by the conduct of its affairs a commitment to the highest professional standards of ethics and scholarship; and
 Investigate, experiment, and report upon any subject of government whenever called upon by Congress or the federal government.

Research 
Through its studies, the academy has focused attention on a range of government issues, including:
 Strategy development and change management
 Organizational structure and design
 Program evaluation
 Human capital and multisector workforce
 Acquisitions, budget and finance
 Intergovernmental relations
 Workshops and outreach

Most studies are carried out under the direction of project panels which consist primarily of elected academy fellows. Recent studies include:
 Bureau of Safety and Environmental Enforcement: Strategic Organizational Assessment (March 2017)
 Agricultural Research Service: Review of Administrative and Financial Management Services (February 2017)
 Centers for Disease Control and Prevention (CDC) Improving CDC’s Executive Recruitment, Performance Management, Compensation and On Boarding Processes (February 2017)
 Federal Aviation Administration: Personnel Reform Effectiveness Assessment (January 2017)

Fellows

The academy's over 850 fellows are current and former public managers and scholars, business executives and labor leaders, Cabinet officers, members of Congress, governors, mayors, state legislators, and diplomats who provide insight and experience as they oversee academy projects and provide general guidance. Fellows are also the academy's primary vehicle for addressing emerging issues and contributing to the intellectual and popular discourse on government. Fellows elect new members of the academy each year. The principal criterion for selection is a sustained and outstanding contribution to the field of public administration through public service or scholarship.

Some notable fellows include:
Robert Agranoff
Mary G. F. Bitterman
Michael M. Crow
James Hendler
Jonathan Koppell
Greg Lashutka
Shelley H. Metzenbaum
Colin Powell
James Perry
Alasdair Roberts
Donna Shalala
Dick Thornburgh
David Walker
William J. Walker
Daniel Weitzner

Board chairs

Current board

Current officers 
 Reginald Robinson, chair
 Sallyanne Harper, vice chair
 Jonathan Fiechter, treasurer
 B.J. Reed, secretary
 Teresa Gerton, president and CEO

Current members 
 Norton N. Bonaparte, Jr.
 Lawrence S. Cooley
 Judy England-Joseph
 Arnold Fields
 Martha Joynt Kumar
 Anne Khademian
 Kristine Marcy
 Jeffrey Neal
 Mark A. Pisano
 F. Stevens Redburn
 Myra Howze Shiplett
 David Van Slyke
 David Warm

Past board members 
 John D. Millett (1970–1973)
 James A. Norton (1973–1974)
 Frederic N. Cleaveland (1974–1978)
 Alan L. Dean (1978–1981)
 Phillip S. Hughes (1981–1985)
 Elmer B. Staats (1985)
 Mark E. Keane (1985–1987)
 Joseph L. Fisher (1987–1991)
 Astrid E. Merget (1991–1993)
 Alfred M. Zuck (1993–1995)
 Peter L. Szanton (1995– 1997)  
 Jonathan Howes (1997–1999)
 David S. C. Chu (1999–2001)
 Jane Pisano (2001–2001)
 Mortimer L. Downey (2001–2002)
 Carl Stenberg (2002–2004)
 Valerie Lemmie (2004–2007)
 J. Christopher Mihm (2007–2010)
 Kenneth S. Apfel (2010–2011)
 Diane M. Disney (2011–unknown)

Executive directors and presidents 

 George A. Graham (1967–1972)
 Roy W. Crawley (1972–1976)
 George H. Esser (1976–1982)
 J. Jackson Walter (1982–1985)
 Ray Kline (1985–1992)
 R. Scott Fosler (1992–2000)
 Robert J. O'Neill, Jr. (2000–2002)
 Phillip M. Burgess (2002–2003)
 Howard M. Messner (2003–2003)
 C. Morgan Kinghorn (2003–2006)
 Howard M. Messner (2006–2007)
 Jennifer L. Dorn (2007–2010)
 Kristine M. Marcy (2011–2011)
 Dan Gregory Blair (2011–2016)
 Terry Gerton (2017–present)

See also
Good Government Organizations (United States)

References

External links
 
 The Collaboration Project
 Memos to National Leaders Project
 The Political Appointee Project

United States
Learned societies of the United States
Patriotic and national organizations chartered by the United States Congress
Non-profit organizations based in the United States